The Krungthep Bridge is a bascule bridge (drawbridge) spanning the Chao Phraya river in Bangkok, Thailand. It was the third bridge to be built across the Chao Phraya river. It was constructed by Fuji Car Manufacturing Co., Ltd, with a budget of 31,912,500 baht.

Heavy congestion on the bridge led to the construction of the nearby Rama III Bridge.

Gallery

References 

Road bridges in Bangkok
Bridges completed in 1959
Bascule bridges
Crossings of the Chao Phraya River
Unregistered ancient monuments in Bangkok